Homdrom is a village in Åmli municipality in Agder county, Norway.

References

Villages in Agder
Åmli